Umberto Micco (24 March 1916 – 16 December 1989) was an Italian field hockey player and politician. He competed in the men's tournament at the 1952 Summer Olympics. Micco became a city councilor in 1965, and later became the mayor of Moncalvo.

References

External links
 

1916 births
1989 deaths
Italian male field hockey players
Olympic field hockey players of Italy
Field hockey players at the 1952 Summer Olympics
Sportspeople from Boston